The April 2014 Chicago crossover event is a two-part fictional crossover that exists within the Chicago (franchise). The event aired on NBC in two one-hour timeslots on consecutive weeknights. It began with "A Dark Day" of Chicago Fire on April 29, 2014, and concluded with "8:30 PM" of Chicago P.D. on April 30, 2014. Both episodes followed a unified storyline of a bombing at Chicago Medical Center and the search and rescue of survivors as well as the investigation of those responsible. Dick Wolf and Matt Olmstead wrote the story for both parts while Michael Brandt and Derek Haas wrote the teleplay. The story was inspired by the Oklahoma City Bombing and Boston Marathon Bombings. The first part of the crossover event received mostly mixed reviews while the second part received more positive reviews.

Plot

Part 1: "A Dark Day"
Boden informs Hermann that he will be acting lieutenant on Truck 81 for the day because Casey and Gabby are volunteering for a charity race event at Chicago Medical. Hermann initially says he needs more time to prepare but agrees. Casey and Gabby run into Burgess, who is watching her niece, when the two are sharing tent space and the two help her get set up. Gabby heads inside to go get registered for the race. Shortly after a car bomb detonates outside the hospital, Casey immediately begins helping survivors outside the hospital while Dawson is missing. Firehouse 51 and others from the Chicago Fire Department arrive and begin search and rescue. Boden sends Cruz and Mills to look for a secondary bomb. Shay heads inside with Dr. Holly Whelan, a pediatrics doctor, to look for more injured, accidentally injuring herself on rebar. Doctors begin to treat Burgess's niece who sustained a crushed liver and is bleeding internally as a result of the explosion. Mills finds a secondary car bomb in a parking structure adjacent to the hospital. Casey and Severide head into a confined space of rubble in search of Gabby. Boden meets Mills and Cruz and find the second bomb is set to detonate at 8:30 PM but Mills successfully diffuses the bomb. Rafferty, Shay, and Whelan are asked to tag additional patients as more survivors are found. Burgess's niece is immediately rushed into surgery and needs a liver transplant. Gabby regains consciousness and is able to alert Casey and Severide to her position. Whelan's sister, who initially seemed to only have a minor concussion, has a seizure and is diagnosed with a subdural hematoma; as a result she is also rushed into surgery. The doctor finds a liver that was initially planned for a Syrian ambassador to the United States and prepares for the transplant but the organ was damaged in the explosion. Casey and Severide find Gabby and the rest of the team begins to dig them out. Atwater arrives to console a distraught Burgess. Voight, Lindsay, Antonio, and Halstead of the Chicago Police Department's intelligence unit as well as Illinois State Police, Federal Bureau of Investigation, Department of Homeland Security, Bureau of Alcohol, Tobacco, Firearms and Explosives, and the Central Intelligence Agency arrive to begin investigating the bombing. Shay collapses in the hospital as a result of her injuries.

Part 2: "8:30 PM"
Whelan immediately comes to Shay's aid and treats her. Boden updates the intelligence unit on the situation. Voight and Antonio along with other departments receive a briefing from the FBI agent leading the investigation. Jin is shown to the secondary car bomb to analyze it while the rest of intelligence including Ruzek, Olinsky, and Sumner begin interviewing witnesses. Jin pulls a print off of the second bomb and acquires a no-knock warrant to search the suspect's apartment. Whelan recommends to her parents that her sister is taken off life support. Intelligence raids the suspect's apartment only to find the suspect murdered. Shay wakes up and begins to recover. Jin finds that one of the suspects known associates is receiving treatment in the hospital. Intelligence attempts to intercept him but the situation escalates when he holds Lindsay hostage at knifepoint and the scene is quickly diffused by Mills. The associate gives Voight the name Ted Powell, Voight recognizes Ted as a person acting suspicious outside the hospital but Ted had since left. Intelligence find the first bomb was intended to detonate at 8:00 PM during a CPD and CFD gala while the second bomb was set to target the first responders; but that the timer on the first bomb was wrongly set to 8:00 AM. Sumner finds that Ted's father Frank Powell had previously been arrested after a two-day standoff in which Ted's mother/Frank's wife was killed in the crossfire. Antonio attempts to strike a deal with Frank to flip on Ted but it doesn't work out. Another doctor approaches Whelan's parents about donating the liver of their daughter, who has been declared brain dead, to Burgess's niece. Intelligence searches a warehouse belonging to another one of Ted's associates and find that three timing devices had been purchased. They think of other high-value targets where a third bomb would do the most damage ultimately coming to the police headquarters. Olinsky spots Ted on the roof of a building adjacent to the police headquarters, Lindsay and Halstead go after him but he takes a hostage and runs. Bomb Squad arrives with eight and a half minutes until the bomb is set to go off and defuses it. Intelligence engages in a shootout with Ted but ultimately take him into custody after Voight personally wounds him for endangering his city. Burgess's niece makes a successful recovery following the liver transplant. Severide shows up at Lindsay's apartment unexpected and the two get intimate.

Cast and characters

Main

Notable guests

Production

Executive producer, Dick Wolf who co-wrote the story for both parts, stated that his inspiration for the crossover came from the Oklahoma City Bombing and Boston Marathon Bombings. The Fire episode was filmed late February 2014, while the P.D. episode filmed in early March 2014; filming took place around Chicago, Illinois including at the former Sears tower in Homan Square and at Cinespace Film Studios Chicago. Wolf stated "As our country has gone through tragedies like that one, it’s the first responders who always set the tone and who always begin to put us back together, and I want to really examine that now that we’ve got these two shows with the fire fighters and the police." In a promotional interview with P.D. star Sophia Bush speaking about the emotion behind-the-scenes of the event said "We always expect things to happen in war, far away, and then when they happen in your backyard, what does that mean?" Sydney Tamiia Poitier guest starred in the P.D. episode as Mia Sumner after being cast in a five-episode story arc.

Reception

Viewing figures
The Fire episode was watched live by 7.06 million viewers while viewers for the P.D. episode the following day rose to 7.28 million. Within seven days, by means of video on demand streaming and other methods, viewership on the first part raised to 10.52 million while the second part rose to 10.90 million. Internationally, in Canada, the first part was viewed by 1.73 million and the second part was viewed by 1.40 million with both series ranking in the top thirty viewed programs for the week at sixteen and twenty-one respectively.

Critical response
When reviewing "A Dark Day," Lisa Casas with Screen Spy, said the explosion is the type of things seen in feature films not small screen television but later stated "'A Dark Day' was supposed to get things rolling, but instead disappointed. All the potential from that initial explosion just went black, deteriorating into a bunch of jumbled story lines, too many for us to care about all of them." Casas also reviewed the second part and called the episode the best of the season so far noting that the P.D. episode was far better than the Fire episode saying that Fire had too many storylines and too large of a cast while P.D. focused on two central storylines with a smaller cast. Matt Carter with CarterMatt reviewed both parts of the crossover stating that the Fire episode was something normally seen in a season finale and that it was terrible and triumphant at the same time. Carter then stated that the P.D. episode fixed a disaster that didn't seem like it could be fixed.

References

2014 American television episodes
Chicago (franchise)
Television crossover episodes
Television episodes set in Chicago